African Studies Quarterly is a peer-reviewed electronic academic journal published quarterly by the Center for African Studies at the University of Florida in Gainesville, Florida, USA. The journal is indexed by the Public Affairs Information Service (PAIS) and by the Gale Group.

External links
 Journal homepage

1997 establishments in Florida
African studies journals
Magazines published in Florida
Open access journals
Publications established in 1997
Quarterly journals
University of Florida